Honoré Dutrey (c. 1894 in New Orleans, Louisiana – July 21, 1935 in Chicago, Illinois) was a dixieland jazz trombonist, probably best known for his work in King Oliver's Creole Jazz Band. In New Orleans, Dutrey played with the Excelsior Brass Band and with John Robichaux's orchestra.

His playing has been contrasted with that of other New Orleans trombonists such as Kid Ory, in that he met the older harmonic and rhythmic functions. He suffered from asthma most of his life after a ship accident damaged his lungs while he was in the Navy in 1917. To combat his asthma on the band stand, he would inhale a nasal spray prescribed to him by a doctor. Eugene Chadbourne wrote that Louis Armstrong worked with many trombonists in his career, "[but as] great as some of them were [...] there was never another Honore Dutrey." Asthma was the cause of Dutrey's death on July 21, 1935.

References

Jazz musicians from New Orleans
Dixieland jazz musicians
American jazz trombonists
Male trombonists
1890s births
1935 deaths
20th-century American musicians
20th-century trombonists
20th-century American male musicians
American male jazz musicians
Excelsior Brass Band members